Hazırəhmədli (also, Hazyrahmedli) is a village and municipality in the Goranboy District of Azerbaijan.  It has a population of 2,347. The municipality consists of the villages of Hazyrahmedli, Beshirli, Garasuchu, and Göynüyən.

References 

Populated places in Goranboy District